You'll Cowards Don't Even Smoke Crack is the fifth studio album by American rapper and record producer Viper. It was released on February 19, 2008, through his own homemade record label, Rhyme Time Records, and later released physically by indie record label Animated Music. It is the most well known of all of his albums, gathering a cult following in the years since its release. Viper himself has been quoted as saying it is his favorite album he has made.

Background
Around 2005, while Viper was studying for his Business Master's degree, he supposedly set himself a task of composing 1000 beats in three months. While it is unknown whether he achieved this goal, this experiment created material that was used for his early releases. This material was used in his albums Ready and... Willing, Heartless Hoodlum and The Southwest Hooligan, released in 2006, You'll Cowards Don't Even Smoke Crack and The Paper Man, released in 2008, and finally The Hiram Clarke Hustler, released in 2009. Viper returned to the material comprising You'll Cowards in 2007, and finished the album in that year.

Viper made all the beats himself using only a Yamaha Motif keyboard and a Roland beat machine. According to Viper himself, the album's upfront lyricism allowed him to address controversial issues with society, such as his crack use and dealership at the time, violence, and his past gang membership with 5-9 Piru, a sub-group of the Bloods.

Cover

The album's cover has become a popular reaction image and internet meme, along with many of Viper's other album covers, with people commonly making their own covers using the rapper's face. The back cover of the indie vinyl issue of the album consists of a fake Fox News report using one of Viper's selfies which he had sent out to fans.

The cover itself is a cropped and poorly scanned image of Viper's face sourced from the cover of his 2006 album The Southwest Hooligan.

Reception
You'll Cowards Don't Even Smoke Crack and Viper in general remained relatively obscure throughout the 2000s, where he would host his albums on the CD Baby to limited exposure. In early 2013, the title track was posted onto YouTube. Since then it has garnered over three million views, and news outlets started to report on the song and album in response.

You'll Cowards Don't Even Smoke Crack received positive coverage in the music press. Sputnik Music wrote that the album fuses "a nostalgic and ethereal blend of cloud rap and vaporwave". The Chicago Reader wrote that the album is "outsider-artist genius. People on the Internet are initially drawn to Viper because of his blatant disregard for grammar, outrageously violent and drug-centric lyrics, and how sonically bizarre he is in general."

You'll Cowards Don't Even Smoke Crack is Viper's most successful album—it became an internet meme due to the quality of its album cover and title, which has been noted as being "shockingly upfront". The title track is also particularly famous online for its lyrical content, production, and vocal delivery.

Physical release and sequel
The album was later remastered and released through the indie record label Animated Music in 2018 celebrating the album's 10th anniversary, with inserts signed by Viper. Viper also self-released a vinyl pressing of the album later in 2021, after promoting them on his Bandcamp as far back as 2018 without actually selling them.

In 2022, Viper announced a sequel to You'll Cowards, entitled Ya'll Cowards Don't Even Smoke Crack (You'll Cowards Don't Even Smoke Crack II). It was set to release on December 25th of 2022, however, its release date was pushed back to June 19th, 2023.

Track listing

On some original issues, this track is also labelled as "Parlayin'".

Personnel
Credits for You'll Cowards Don't Even Smoke Crack adapted from liner notes.
 Lee A. Carter – vocals, writer, composer, producer, album art

Animated Music issue
 Will Killingsworth – remastering
 Brian Baynes – back artwork, layout

References 

2008 albums
Internet memes
Internet memes introduced in 2013
Outsider music albums
Self-released albums
Viper (rapper) albums